Ravindra Kalia (1939-2016) was an editor, novelist, storyteller and memoir writer in Hindi literature.

Biography
Ravindra Kalia, born in Jalandhar, Panjab on November 11, 1939, has recently retired from the post of Director of the Indian Jnanpith, making him the compulsory magazine of Hindi literature as soon as he took up the responsibility of editing 'Naya Gyanodaya'.  Ravindra Kalia's wife, Mamta Kalia, is also a popular Hindi author.

Writing
Story collection

 Nine years younger wife
 Remove poverty
 Street brush
 Chakaiya Neem
 Until the age of 27
 Little light

Novel

 God is safe
 A B C D.
 17 Ranade Road

Memoirs

 Memorandum of memories
 Comrade monalisa
 Hitchhiker of creation
 Ghalib hidden wine

Satire collections

 Why can't you sleep overnight
 Melody adulteration cons

Storybook

 Ravindra Kalia's stories
 Ten representative stories
 Twenty one best stories

Awards
U.P.  Premchand Smriti Samman of Hindi Institute,

 M.P.  Padumlal Bakshi Award by Sahitya Akademi, (2004)
 U.P.  Sahitya Bhushan Bhushan Award by Hindi organization (2004)
 U.P.  Lohia Award by Hindi Institute, (2008)
 Shiromani Literature

References

1939 births
2016 deaths
Hindi-language poets